Wall Doxey State Park is a public recreation area located off Mississippi Highway 7,  south of Holly Springs, Mississippi.  The state park is centered on  Spring Lake.

History
Wall Doxey State Park is one of the original state parks built in Mississippi in the 1930s by the Civilian Conservation Corps. Originally known as Spring Lake, the park was the eighth park in Mississippi created by the CCC. The CCC began work 1935; the park opened in 1938. Workers with the National Youth Administration also contributed to the park's development, adding a cabin in 1938. In 1956, the park was renamed in honor of Mississippi politician Wall Doxey.

Activities and amenities
The park features lake fishing, primitive and developed campsites, cabins and cottage,  nature trail, picnic area, and two disc golf courses. A narrow levee surrounds a third of the spring-fed lake which, in its shallows, has cypresses and dense vegetation.

References

External links

Wall Doxey State Park Mississippi Department of Wildlife, Fisheries, and Parks
Wall Doxey State Park Map Mississippi Department of Wildlife, Fisheries, and Parks

Protected areas of Marshall County, Mississippi
State parks of Mississippi
Holly Springs, Mississippi
Historic districts on the National Register of Historic Places in Mississippi
National Register of Historic Places in Marshall County, Mississippi
Parks on the National Register of Historic Places in Mississippi
Protected areas established in 1935
1935 establishments in Mississippi